Nari (also Romanized as Nārī; also known as Nerī) is a village in Dul Rural District, in the Central District of Urmia County, West Azerbaijan Province, Iran. At the 2006 census, its population was 698, in 141 families.

References 

Populated places in Urmia County